The OSO Arts Centre is a theatre and arts centre located in Barnes in the London Borough of Richmond upon Thames. The building was previously the postal sorting office, but was redeveloped into a mixture of residential and commercial space with the first residents moving in in 1999. In 2002 the arts centre opened and in 2012 the OSO Arts Centre came under the direction of a new board of trustees. The building is located on Barnes Green, and provides arts services to the community, both in the form of evening performances in the theatre space, and daytime dance and art classes. Some well-known names have performed at the OSO over the years including Patricia Hodge, Timothy West, Stephanie Cole, Julian Glover, Janie Dee, Issy van Randwyck, Harriet Thorpe, Lee Nelson and Robert Pattinson.

The theatre is currently led by Artistic Director Jonny Danciger and General Manager Lisa Ross. Its artistic ambassadors include Gyles Brandreth, Roger McGough and Kate Silverton.

During the Covid-19 pandemic in 2020 the theatre space was refurbished as a 'Crisis Kitchen', with the OSO staff and volunteers preparing over 10,000 free meals for the elderly and vulnerable, NHS workers, and those in economic hardship. The chair of trustees was awarded an MBE in the 2021 New Years Honours list for this initiative.

A full refurbishment of the venue, designed by B3 Designers, was completed in Autumn 2020. The refurbished theatre was officially opened by Michael Ball in October 2020.

References

External links
Official website

2002 establishments in England
Arts centres in London
Barnes, London
Buildings and structures in the London Borough of Richmond upon Thames
 Sorting offices
Theatres in the London Borough of Richmond upon Thames